Olea lancea grows as a shrub or small tree up to  tall.

Distribution
It is known from Madagascar, Mauritius, La Réunion and Rodrigues.

References

lancea